Brooks Macek (born May 15, 1992) is a Canadian-German professional ice hockey centre. He is currently playing with Avtomobilist Yekaterinburg of the Kontinental Hockey League (KHL). Macek was picked by the Detroit Red Wings in the 2010 NHL Entry Draft in the 6th round, 171st overall.

Playing career
Macek played for the Notre Dame Hounds at the Bantam AAA and Midget AAA level before entering the WHL in 2008. Macek would play a total of 319 WHL games until 2013, first representing the Tri-City Americans, followed by a stint with the Calgary Hitmen.

Following an outstanding 2012–13 season with the Calgary Hitmen, in which he served as an assistant captain and scored 32 goals in 70 games to go along with 48 assists in WHL play, Macek decided to accept an offer from Germany: In June 2013, he inked a two-year deal with the Iserlohn Roosters of the German top-flight Deutsche Eishockey Liga. In 2015, he had his contract renewed for the 2015–16 campaign. After three years with the Roosters and 154 DEL appearances with the team (51 goals, 61 assists) plus 22 playoff contests (nine goals, seven assists), Macek decided to move on. In May 2016, he signed with fellow DEL side EHC München. He scored 23 goals and assisted on 22 more en route to winning the 2017 German championship with München. In 2018, he won a second straight German championship. He tallied 34 goals and 25 assists in 67 games during the 2017-18 campaign.

On June 12, 2018, Macek signed a one-year deal (worth an NHL average annual value of $650,000 and an American Hockey League base salary of $175,000) with the Vegas Golden Knights of the NHL. In his first professional season in North America, Macek was assigned by the Golden Knights to American Hockey League (AHL) affiliate, the Chicago Wolves, for the duration of the 2018-19 season. He showed his offensive instincts, earning a top-line role in finishing third in scoring with 26 goals and 34 assists for 60 points in 64 games. He posted 5 goals in 17 playoff games as the Wolves reached the Calder Cup finals.

On June 21, 2019, Macek left the Vegas Golden Knights as an impending restricted free agent, agreeing to a one-year contract with Russian club, Avtomobilist Yekaterinburg of the KHL.

International play

A Canadian of German descent, Macek has dual citizenship in Canada and Germany (his father comes from Geldern, Germany) In November 2015, he landed a spot on the roster of Germany's national team for the Deutschland-Cup and made his debut for Team Germany against Switzerland during the tournament.

In 2016, he played his first World Championship with the German national team. At the 2018 Winter Olympics, he helped Germany win silver, which was the country's greatest ever international achievement.

Career statistics

Regular season and playoffs

International

References

External links 
 

1992 births
Living people
Avtomobilist Yekaterinburg players
Calgary Hitmen players
Canadian ice hockey centres
Canadian people of German descent
Chicago Wolves players
Detroit Red Wings draft picks
EHC München players
Ice hockey players at the 2018 Winter Olympics
Iserlohn Roosters players
Medalists at the 2018 Winter Olympics
Olympic ice hockey players of Germany
Olympic medalists in ice hockey
Olympic silver medalists for Germany
Ice hockey people from Winnipeg
Tri-City Americans players
Citizens of Germany through descent
Canadian expatriate ice hockey players in Russia
German expatriate sportspeople in Russia
Expatriate ice hockey players in Russia
German expatriate ice hockey people
Canadian expatriate ice hockey players in the United States
German expatriate sportspeople in the United States